Jesper Jensen (born 30 October 1977) is a Danish handball player and currently the head coach of Team Esbjerg as well as the Danish women's national team. He was named World Coach of the Year (female teams) in 2021 by IHF.

He is brother of the former Danish handball player and 2004 Olympic champion, Trine Jensen.

Jensen won the 2008 European Men's Handball Championship with the Danish men's national handball team. He was part of the team which finished seventh in the 2008 Olympic tournament. He played all eight matches and scored 16 goals.

On 17 February 2011, Jensen stopped on the Danish men's national team after 120 games and 238 goals.

In 2020, he was named head coach of the Danish women's national team and coached them at the 2020 European Women's Handball Championship. He lad Danish women's national team to silver medals at
2022 European Women's Handball Championship.

References

External links

1977 births
Living people
Danish male handball players
Danish handball coaches
Olympic handball players of Denmark
Handball players at the 2008 Summer Olympics
Sportspeople from Aarhus
Handball coaches of international teams